Dangerous is the first live album by American stand-up comedian and satirist Bill Hicks, released in 1990 by Invasion Records. Much of the material was previously performed in Hicks' Sane Man special in 1989.

Hicks explained the title to the Los Angeles Times by referencing a quote he attributed to Thomas Jefferson, although the veracity of the quote is not confirmed.[Jefferson's] quote was "No idea is dangerous to society wherein that idea can be openly discussed." That's why the album is called "Dangerous," because I'm discussing drugs and things drugs do.

In 1997, Rykodisc issued remastered versions of both Dangerous and its follow-up, Relentless (1992), on CD, as well as the posthumous albums Arizona Bay and Rant in E-Minor.

Track listing

Personnel
Bill Hicks – performer

Technical
Peter Casperson – producer, executive producer
Matt Hathaway – engineer	
Nancy Albino – engineer
Sam Smith – editing assistant 
Joel Soyffer – mixing, editing
Andre Roquette – technical assistant
Steve Rosenthal – technical assistant
Hell's Kitchen Grafix – design
Graham Haber – cover photo
Bill Scheft – introduction
Jack Mondrus – direction

References

Bill Hicks albums
1990 live albums
1990s comedy albums
Live comedy albums
Spoken word albums by American artists
Live spoken word albums
Stand-up comedy albums